The Sob (Turkish: Hıçkırık) is a 1953 Turkish drama film directed by Atıf Yılmaz.

Cast
 Muzaffer Tema
 Nedret Güvenç as Nalan 
 Temel Karamahmut
 Leman Akçatepe
 Osman Altınay
 Muazzez Arçay
 İhsan Aşkın
 Abdullah Ataç
 Fatma Bilgen
 Karin Davutoğlu
 Belkis Dilligil
 Muazzez Dogan
 Bilsev Etüs
 Reşit Gürzap
 Alev Koral
 Settar Körmükçü
 Tunç Nuyan
 Nejat Saydam
 Dursune Şirin
 Yetvart Yeretzyan
 Lebibe Çakin 
 Feridun Çölgeçen

References

Bibliography
 Gönül Dönmez-Colin. The Routledge Dictionary of Turkish Cinema. Routledge, 2013.

External links
 

1953 films
1953 drama films
Films based on Turkish novels
1950s Turkish-language films
Turkish romantic drama films
Turkish black-and-white films
Films set in Istanbul
Films shot in Istanbul
Films shot in Rome
Films about cancer